is a 2013 Japanese animated film produced by Sunrise based on the Gintama manga and anime series. It was directed by the director from the anime series Yoichi Fujita and based on a story by Hideaki Sorachi, Gin Tamas original author. It stars Tomokazu Sugita, Daisuke Sakaguchi, Rie Kugimiya among others. The film focuses on the freelancer samurai Gintoki Sakata in a time travelling story where he encounters older personas of the people he met in Edo.

The Final Chapter was first announced August 2012 although major details were not released until early 2013. Although the film has been marketed as "Final Chapter" Sorachi and Fujita did not confirm it was the last anime production from Gin Tama; the former wrote the story with the concept of the series' ending. Two themes were provided by the bands SPYAIR and Tommy heavenly6, with latter's song having already been used in the television series.

Plot
While working in a cinema, Gintoki comes upon a "movie thief" (a figure in Japanese culture often depicted as a man with a video camera as a head, stand in as someone who illegally film in cinemas). After scolding the movie thief for his actions, he finds himself warped into another world via the camera lens. In this world, 5 years have passed, and not only has the land of Edo changed into an apocalyptic wasteland, but it is stated Gintoki has died. The movie thief, or Time Thief the time machine, explains mankind is close to extinction, and gives Gintoki an item to disguise himself. After the Time Thief is damaged by criminals, Gintoki encounters his freelancer comrades:  Shinpachi Shimura, who has turned into a cool samurai with no trace of tsukkomi, and Kagura, who has changed into a beautiful woman with no Chinese speech pattern. The future's Gintoki is assumed to have died as a result of the "White Curse." Kagura and Shinpachi have been trying to deal with their leader's disappearance and Gintoki, disguised thanks to the Time Thief, tries to help them overcome their sadness.

Gintoki, Kagura and Shinpachi go to the execution of the Shinsengumi leader Isao Kondo, Joi terrorist Kotaro Katsura and mechanic Gengai Hiraga. Kondo and Katsura are saved by their underlings Sogo Okita, Toshiro Hijikata and Elizabeth who have joined forces to form a new group opposing the bakufu while Gengai is revealed to be an imposter. Interacting with the new group Gintoki learns the White Curse was started by a group of sorcerers known as  who Gintoki's Joi faction fought in a previous war. Gintoki was infected with a virus which had undergone an incubation period and the future's Gintoki disappeared while fighting it. One victim of the White Curse is Shinpachi's sister, Tae, who is close to her death. In order to cure her, Gintoki's friends go to search for the Emmi. Gintoki finds and kills the Emmi who is revealed to be the future's Gintoki who set this series of events off to be killed by his past self.

Despite the death of the future Gintoki, the White Curse does not stop. Gintoki used the repaired Time Thief to go back to the past and kill his past self from the war, the White Demon, before the virus goes into incubation. However, the White Demon is actually Taizo Hasegawa in disguise. It is revealed that Tama is the Time Thief who was used by the people from the future to stop Gintoki from erasing his existence and help him defeat the Emmi before the curse starts. Together with his friends and the last generation of the old Jouishi (Katsura, Takasugi, Sakamoto, and the white demon otherwise known as the Gintoki from the past) fight against the Emmi. Finally, Gintoki and the white demon defeat the Emmi, stopping them from starting the curse. Gintoki reunites with the Yorozuya and then him and his friends return to their own timeline, all promising to meet again. The ending scene consists of the original members of the Jōi watching from a cliff. At the end of the story, after the credits end, it shows that Gintoki, Shinpachi, and Kagura meeting together even after the past is changed.

Cast

The cast from the TV series returned to voice the characters with:

Tomokazu Sugita as Gintoki Sakata. A freelancer samurai travelling across time to find the source of the virus. Sugita expressed satisfaction with the script.
Daisuke Sakaguchi as Shinpachi Shimura. Gintoki's apprentice of samurai who has grown into a skilled warrior in the future. Sakaguchi found it felt like the story fitted the series. Due to Shinpachi's portrayal as a stronger character, Sakaguchi commented it was difficult voicing him for the movie.
Rie Kugimiya as Kagura. A young girl who grew into a quite skilled fighter in the future. Kugimiya shared similar feelings about her work as the older Kagura based on her calm dialogue despite sharing several traits from her common persona.
Mikako Takahashi as Sadaharu / Otsuu-chan
Susumu Chiba as Isao Kondo
Kazuya Nakai as Toshiro Hijikata
Kenichi Suzumura as Sogo Okita
Tetsuharu Ōta as Sagaru Yamazaki
Akira Ishida as Kotaro Katsura
Satsuki Yukino as Tae Shimura
Fumiko Orikasa as Kyubei Yagyu
Yū Kobayashi as Ayame "Sacchan" Sarutobi
Yūko Kaida as Tsukuyo
Kujira as Otose
Omi Minami as Tama
Yū Sugimoto as Catherine
Fumihiko Tachiki as Taizo Hasegawa
Bin Shimada as Gengai Hiraga
Kōji Yusa as Ayumu Tojo
Kōichi Sakaguchi as Musashi-Like Man
Takehito Koyasu as Shinsuke Takasugi
Shinichirō Miki as Tatsuma Sakamoto
Akira Kamiya as Future Elizabeth
Tsutomu Isobe as Emmi
Kōichi Yamadera as Time Bandit

Production
The movie was announced in August 2012 in Shueisha's Weekly Shonen Jump magazine where the manga was published. The announcement came alongside the confirmation the story was being written by Hideaki Sorachi. The television series used to show part of its logo until revealing the full title during March 2013. Although it was titled "Final Chapter", Sorachi said the manga series was not ending and he believed it could refer to the film being Sunrise's last production based on the series. Having been told by Sunrise about the film's title and material, Sorachi wrote a story that could be considered the end of the series. Additionally, director Yoichi Fujita commented they would make a continuation if it became a hit.

Music
The film uses two musical themes: the insert theme  by SPYAIR and the ending theme "Pray" by Tommy heavenly6. While "Pray" was previously used as the series' first opening theme, "Genjō Destruction" was composed for this movie and its single was released on July 3, 2013. SPYAIR had previously contributed with two other themes for the TV series. SPYAIR read the script of the movie and later had a talk with Fujita in order to get an idea for "Genjō Destruction." They learned the theme was going to be used in a fight scene and thus worked to compose a high quality song in order to make it match with the movie. A twenty-three theme CD soundtrack was released on July 3, 2013 by Aniplex.

Changes
The Anime Book for the 2nd Gintama movie had a bonus part where it showed off the storyboards of the original version of movie 2 where there were 3 additional scenes that were cut from the final version. These scenes include: all the future versions of the Gintama characters, with the exception of Gintoki, Tae, and the ones who don't feature in the film having dialog. A conversation with Gintoki and Gengai after Gintoki met his future self, and the most important one, a cut scene that would have explained how the memories of Gintoki came back to the others, with Tama, having saved pictures of Gintoki and using it to show everyone around giving them back the memories of Gintoki. Additionally, there were two further changes made, a different version of the opening and a different version of how Gintoki and Future Gintoki talk would have gone down.

Release
In December 2012 at Jump Festa the cast from the Gintama anime series commented they were not sure when the film was going to be released due to delays from the script. The delay to Summer 2013 was confirmed in January 2013 in an episode from the TV series. An anime event titled "Soul of Silver" was made to promote the movie in Osaka. The DVD featuring videos and interviews from event was released on October 23, 2013. A novelization of the film by Ohsaki Tomohito was released by Shueisha on July 8, 2013.

The film premiered in theaters on July 6, 2013. A preopening was made at Ryogoku Kokugikan on June 29, 2013 with a fan event featuring appearances by the voice actors from the series. Movie goers can buy special flavored popcorn representing the characters of Gintoki Sakata, Kagura and Toshiro Hijikata. Additionally, all of them are given notepads with "Volume 0-style" cover made by Hideaki Sorachi.

Box office and sales
The movie debuted in the Japanese box office fourth earning ¥281,776,256 (US$2,821,707) on 127 screens. Oricon reported in August 2013 that it sold over one million tickets surpassing the ticket sales from the previous Gin Tama film. By the end of 2013, the film grossed  at the Japanese box office.

It was released in DVD and Blu-ray format on December 18, 2013 by Aniplex. The two are available in both regular and limited editions, the latter including a bonus extra CD. A week after its release, the Blu-ray sold 38,783 units in Japan, while in mid-January 2014 it reached a total of 44,778 units sold.

References

External links
  
 
 

2013 anime films
2013 films
Anime films based on manga
Gintama
2010s Japanese-language films
Japanese animated films
Sunrise (company)
Animated films about time travel
Warner Bros. films
Warner Bros. animated films